Kocina may refer to the following places:
Kocina, Greater Poland Voivodeship (west-central Poland)
Kocina, Łódź Voivodeship (central Poland)
Kocina, Świętokrzyskie Voivodeship (south-central Poland)